The List of shipwrecks in 1774 includes some ships sunk, wrecked or otherwise lost during 1774.

January

5 January

6 January

8 January

10 January

12 January

17 January

19 January

Unknown date

February

1 February

7 February

16 February

20 February

27 February

Unknown date

March

1 March

Unknown date

April

6 April

13 April

14 April

Unknown date

May

1 May

3 June

11 May

25 May

27 May

Unknown date

June

3 June

4 June

8 June

14 June

Unknown date

July

23 July

Unknown date

August

3 August

16 August

Unknown date

September

3 September

6 September

18 September

20 September

29 September

30 September

Unknown date

October

11 October

22 October

29 October

30 October

Unknown date

November

2 November

5 November

7 November

8 November

10 November

19 November

22 November

24 November

25 November

28 November

30 November

Unknown date

December

2 December

4 December

10 December

13 December

30 December

Unknown date

Unknown date

References

1774